The Land of Nod is a location mentioned in the Bible to where Cain was exiled. It may also refer to:
Another word for sleep

The Land of Nod (company), a catalog, web, and retail store company
The Land of Nod (book), Hugo Award-nominated novelette by Mike Resnick
Land of Nod country estate in Headley Down, Hampshire, England, seat of the Whitaker family
"Land of Nod", an episode of the TV series Powers
a poem from A Child's Garden of Verses by Robert Louis Stevenson

Music
The Land of Nod (band), a British post-rock band
"Land of Nod", a song by British electronic music trio Is Tropical on their debut album Native To